Joshua Wilson (born March 11, 1985) is a former American football cornerback. He was drafted by the Seattle Seahawks in the second round of the 2007 NFL Draft. He played college football at the University of Maryland.

Wilson has also played for the Baltimore Ravens, Washington Redskins, and Atlanta Falcons.

Collegiate career
A graduate of DeMatha Catholic High School, Wilson saw action in all 11 games as a true freshman and became a starting cornerback late in his sophomore year, a job he never relinquished.  By his senior season he was one of the top cornerbacks in the nation.  He also had 847 yards as a kick returner in the 2006 season.  In his career, he tallied 157 tackles, including 100 solo stops, had two career interceptions, 25 passes defended, forced two fumbles, recovered two fumbles, and blocked three kicks.

Track and field
Wilson also ran track at DeMatha Catholic High School, where he was a part of a school record-setting 4 × 100 metres relay team. He also set state records of 10.84 seconds in the 100 meters and 21.56 seconds in the 200 meters. He also competed in the 60 meters, posting a personal best time of 6.98 seconds.

Professional career

2007 NFL Combine

Seattle Seahawks
Wilson was drafted in second round with the 55th overall pick by the Seattle Seahawks in the 2007 NFL Draft.
During a week three home game against the Cincinnati Bengals, Wilson returned the opening kickoff 72 yards to help set up a Matt Hasselbeck touchdown pass to Bobby Engram. In week 12, against the St. Louis Rams, Josh Wilson returned an 89-yard kickoff return for a touchdown. He recorded 9 tackles in 12 games. On October 26, 2008 against the San Francisco 49ers Josh Wilson ran back a 75-yard interception for a touchdown. At the end of the 2008 season, Josh Wilson had 76 tackles, 4 interceptions (one returned for a touchdown), and 1 sack.

Baltimore Ravens

2010 season
On August 31, 2010, he was traded to the Baltimore Ravens, for a conditional 2011 Draft pick.
Wilson returned an interception for a touchdown in overtime against the Houston Texans on December 13, 2010 to help the Ravens win 34-28. That was one of three interceptions that Wilson had in his lone season in Baltimore.

Washington Redskins

2011 season
On July 27, 2011, Wilson signed with the Washington Redskins to a three-year, $13.5 million contract with $9 million guaranteed. He was made the starting right cornerback. Wilson made his first interception for the Redskins in the end zone in Week 14 against the New England Patriots. In Week 15 against the New York Giants, Wilson made his second interception of the season, which happened to also be in the end zone.
In the 2011 season, Wilson started in all 16 games recording 62 combined tackles, 15 pass break-ups, two interceptions, and one forced fumble.

2012 season
In the 2012 season, Wilson continued to be the starting right outside cornerback. In Week 2 against the St. Louis Rams, he recovered a fumble and returned the ball 30 yards for a touchdown after Perry Riley stripped the ball from Danny Amendola. Later in the third quarter, Wilson was forced to leave the game early due to suffering a concussion after tackling Rams runningback Daryl Richardson in the third quarter and preventing him from getting a touchdown. On September 19, 2012, he was officially cleared from his concussion and allowed to practice. In the Week 7 game against the New York Giants, he recorded his first interception of the season; making this the second time in a row he picked off Eli Manning since their last meeting in 2011. Wilson would manage to force a fumble, which was recovered by DeJon Gomes in a Week 12 win against the Dallas Cowboys on Thanksgiving.

2013 season
In 2013, Wilson had a particularly poor performance against the San Francisco 49ers, where he lost several times to Anquan Boldin and Vernon Davis in one-on-one coverage.

Atlanta Falcons

2014 season
On April 8, 2014, Wilson signed with the Atlanta Falcons on a one-year contract.

Detroit Lions

2015 season
On April 3, 2015, Wilson signed a one-year contract with the Detroit Lions.

Personal life
Wilson's father, Tim Wilson, played in the NFL for eight years, mostly for the Houston Oilers.  He was best friends with the legendary Earl Campbell, whom Josh calls "Uncle Earl".  His father died in 1996, and Josh carries around a football card of him.

Wilson grew up as a fan of the Washington Redskins.

References

External links
 Official Web site
 
 Maryland Terrapins bio
 Washington Redskins bio
 Atlanta Falcons bio

1985 births
Living people
Players of American football from Houston
People from Hyattsville, Maryland
Maryland Terrapins football players
American football cornerbacks
Seattle Seahawks players
Baltimore Ravens players
Washington Redskins players
Atlanta Falcons players
Detroit Lions players